Viktor Demyanenko (born 11 June 1991) is a Kazakstani judoka.

He is the bronze medallist of the 2018 Judo Grand Prix Tunis in the -100 kg category.

References

External links
 

1991 births
Living people
Kazakhstani male judoka
Judoka at the 2018 Asian Games
Asian Games competitors for Kazakhstan
21st-century Kazakhstani people